Miniature Golf is a golf video game developed for the Atari VCS (later called the Atari 2600) by Tom Reuterdahl and published by Atari, Inc. in 1978.

Gameplay

There are nine playable holes in Miniature Golf. The goal of each hole is to get the ball into the cup. Each time the player hits the ball, a stroke is added to their score. The number of strokes the player may take are unlimited. A par represents the number to strokes the player ideally must take to complete the hole.

See also

List of Atari 2600 games

References

1978 video games
Atari games
Atari 2600 games
Atari 2600-only games
Miniature golf video games
Video games developed in the United States